Semi-solid metal casting (SSM) is a near net shape variant of die casting. The process is used today with non-ferrous metals, such as aluminium, copper, and magnesium, but also can work with higher temperature alloys for which no currently suitable die materials are available. The process combines the advantages of casting and forging. The process is named after the fluid property thixotropy, which is the phenomenon that allows this process to work. Simply, thixotropic fluids flow when sheared, but thicken when standing. The potential for this type of process was first recognized in the early 1970s. There are three different processes: thixocasting, rheocasting, thixomolding. SIMA refers to a specialized process to prepare aluminum alloys for thixocasting using hot and cold working .

SSM is done at a temperature that puts the metal between its liquidus and solidus temperature. Ideally, the metal should be 30 to 65% solid. The semi-solid mixture must have a low viscosity to be usable, and to reach this low viscosity the material needs a globular primary surrounded by the liquid phase. The temperature range possible depends on the material and for aluminum alloys can be as much as 50 °C, but for narrow melting range copper alloys can be only several tenths of a degree.

Semi-solid casting is typically used for high-end applications. For aluminum alloys, typical parts include structural medical and aerospace parts, pressure containing parts, defense parts, engine mounts, air manifold sensor harnesses, engine blocks, and oil pump filter housings.

Processes
There are a number of different techniques to produce semi-solid castings. For aluminum alloys the more common processes are thixocasting and rheocasting.

With magnesium alloys, the most common process is molding.

Thixocasting
Thixocasting utilizes a pre-cast billet with a non-dendritic microstructure that is normally produced by vigorously stirring the melt as the bar is being cast. Induction heating is normally used to re-heat the billets to the semi-solid temperature range, and die casting machines are used to inject the semi-solid material into hardened steel dies. Thixocasting is being performed commercially in North America, Europe and Asia. Thixocasting has the ability to produce extremely high quality components due to the product consistency that results from using pre-cast billet that is manufactured under the same ideal continuous processing conditions that are employed to make forging or rolling stock. The main disadvantage is that it is expensive due to the special billets that must be used, although facilities with in house magnetohydrodynamic continuous casting capabilities can recycle 100% of in-house returns. Other disadvantages include a limited number of alloys, and for facilities without in-house magnetohydrodynamic casting capability scrap cannot be directly reused.

Rheocasting
Unlike thixocasting, which re-heats a billet, rheocasting develops the semi-solid slurry from the molten metal produced in a typical die casting furnace. This is a big advantage over thixocasting because it results in less expensive feedstock, in the form of typical die casting alloys, and allows for direct recycling.  However, rheocasting also poses process control issues such that after an initial surge of activity, very little material is processed via rheocasting.

Thixomolding
For magnesium alloys, thixomolding uses a machine similar to injection molding. In a single step process, room temperature magnesium alloy chips are fed into the back end of a heated barrel through a volumetric feeder. The barrel is maintained under an argon atmosphere to prevent oxidation of the magnesium chips. A screw conveyor located inside the barrel feeds the magnesium chips forward as they are heated into the semi-solid temperature range. The screw rotation provides the necessary shearing force to generate the globular structure needed for semi-solid casting. Once enough slurry has accumulated, the screw moves forward to inject the slurry into a steel die.

Strain-induced melt-activated (SIMA)
In the SIMA method the material is first heated to the SMM temperature. As it nears the solidus temperature the grains recrystallize to form a fine grain structure. After the solidus temperature is passed the grain boundaries melt to form the SSM microstructure. For this method to work the material should be extruded or cold rolled in the half-hard tempered state.

Advantages
The advantages of semi-solid casting are as follows:
Complex parts produced net shape
Porosity free
Reduced shrinkage
Excellent mechanical performance
Pressure tightness
Tight tolerances
Thin walls
Heat treatable (T4/T5/T6)
Good surface finish

High consolidation pressures are used to produce high integrity parts, and temperatures required to die-cast semi-solid metal are lower than normal casting; conventional tool steel materials are typically used in production applications. The lack of suitable high temperature die materials limits the casting of high melting point metals, such as tool steel and stellite, only to experimental applications. Other advantages include ease of  automation, consistency, production rates equal to or better than die casting rates, no air entrapment, low shrinkage rates, and uniform microstructure.

Disadvantages
Production facilities do require a higher degree of control over process conditions, but standard die casting machines are very suitable for production albeit with higher final injection pressures and lower injection velocities.
While selling thixocast scrap can be costly, facilities with on-site magneto-hydrodynamic continuous casting capabilities are able to completely recycle all in-house material returns.
Because thixotropy (semi-solid state) is a middle state in physical or rheological sense, this process is relatively insensitive to ambient temperature since small heat losses cause only minor changes in fraction solid.

See also
Metal injection molding
Spray forming

References

Notes

Bibliography
.

External links
Video of an automatic forging cell for SSM

Casting (manufacturing)
Metalworking

pt:Fundição injetada